
Gmina Łubnice is a rural gmina (administrative district) in Wieruszów County, Łódź Voivodeship, in central Poland.

Villages
Gmina Łubnice contains the villages and settlements of Andrzejów, Dzietrzkowice, Kolonia Dzietrzkowice, Łubnice, Ludwinów and Wójcin.

Neighbouring gminas
Gmina Łubnice is bordered by the gminas of Biała, Bolesławiec, Byczyna, Czastary, Gorzów Śląski and Skomlin.

References
Polish official population figures 2006

Lubnice
Wieruszów County